George Affleck may refer to:
 George Affleck (footballer) (born 1888), Scottish footballer
 George Affleck (entrepreneur) (born 1964), Canadian politician and businessman
 George B. Affleck (1874–1958), American football and basketball coach